Auguste Molinier (30 September 185119 May 1904) was a French historian.

Biography
Born in Toulouse, Auguste Molinier was a student at the École Nationale des Chartes, which he left in 1873, and also at the École pratique des hautes études; and he obtained appointments in the public libraries at the Mazarine (1878), at Fontainebleau (1884), and at Sainte-Geneviève, of which he was nominated librarian in 1885.

He was a good palaeographer and had a thorough knowledge of archives and manuscripts; and he soon won a first place among scholars of the history of medieval France. His thesis on leaving the École des Chartes was his  (inserted in vol. xxxiv of the ), an important contribution to the history of the Albigenses.

Applying to the French classics the rigorous method used with regard to the texts of the Middle Ages, he published the Pensées of Pascal, revised with the original manuscript (1887–1889), and the Provinciales (1891), edited with notes.

His elder brother, Charles (born 1843), is also of some importance as an historian, particularly on the history of art and on the heresies of the Middle Ages. He was appointed professor of history at the university of Toulouse in 1886.
A younger brother, Émile (1857–1906), was keeper at the Musée du Louvre and a well-known connoisseur of art.

Works
 "Catalogue des actes de Simon et d'Amaury de Montfort" in Bibliothèque de l’École des chartes, vol. 34
 Étude sur l'administration féodale dans le Languedoc (900-1250), 1878
 Les Pensées de Blaise Pascal. Texte revu sur le manuscrit autographe, avec une préface et des notes, 1877–1879
 Itinera hierosolymitana et descriptiones terrae sanctae bellis sacris anteriora (ed. with Titus Tobler), 1879
 Inventaire sommaire de la collection Joly de Fleury, 1881
 Chronique normande du XIVe siècle, 1882, (ed. with Émile Molinier) Available on Gallica
 Vie de Louis le Gros de Suger, suivie de l'Histoire du roi Louis VII, 1887
 Géographie historique de la province de Languedoc au Moyen Âge, 1889
 Les Obituaires français au moyen âge, 1890
 Les Provinciales de Blaise Pascal, avec une préface et des notes (2 vol.), 1891
 Les manuscrits et les miniatures, 1892 Available on Gallica
 Correspondence administrative d'Alfonse de Poitiers, 1894-1900 Available on Gallica: tome 1 tome 2
 Les sources de l'histoire de France (des origines aux guerres d'Italie, 1494), 1901–1906
 Collaboration on the catalogues of manuscripts of the libraries of Beaune, Toulouse, Dijon, Chartres, Cambrai, etc.

References

External links
 

1851 births
Writers from Toulouse
1904 deaths
French archivists
19th-century French historians
French librarians
French medievalists
École Nationale des Chartes alumni
Academic staff of the École Nationale des Chartes